Eatonina caribaea is a species of minute sea snail, a marine gastropod mollusk in the family Cingulopsidae.

Description

Distribution

References

 Faber M.J. 2005. Marine gastropods from the ABC-islands and other localities. 6. A new species of Coriandria (Gastropoda: Cingulopsidae). Miscellanea Malacologica, 1(4): 73-75.
 Rolan E. & Redferns C. (2005) The genus Eatonina (Gastropoda, Rissoidea) in the Caribbean. Visaya 1(5): 12-15

External links

Cingulopsidae
Gastropods described in 2005